David Rice Atchison (August 11, 1807January 26, 1886) was a mid-19th century Democratic United States Senator from Missouri. He served as President pro tempore of the United States Senate for six years. Atchison served as a major general in the Missouri State Militia in 1838 during Missouri's Mormon War and as a Confederate brigadier general during the American Civil War under Major General Sterling Price in the Missouri Home Guard. Some of Atchison's associates claimed that for 24 hours—Sunday, March 4, 1849 through noon on Monday—he may have been Acting President of the United States. This belief, however, is dismissed by nearly all scholars.

Atchison, who owned a plantation and many enslaved African Americans, was a prominent pro-slavery activist and Border Ruffian leader, deeply involved with violence against abolitionists and other free-staters during the "Bleeding Kansas" events that preceded admission of the state to the Union.

Early life
Atchison was born to William Atchison and his wife in Frogtown (later Kirklevington), which is now part of Lexington, Kentucky. He was educated at Transylvania University in Lexington. Classmates included five future Democratic senators (Solomon Downs of Louisiana, Jesse Bright of Indiana, George Wallace Jones of Iowa, Edward Hannegan of Indiana, and Jefferson Davis of Mississippi). Atchison completed law studies and was admitted to the Kentucky bar in 1829.

Missouri lawyer and politician
In 1830 he moved to Liberty in Clay County in western Missouri, and set up practice there. He also acquired a farm or plantation, with labor provided by enslaved African Americans. Atchison's law practice flourished, and his best-known client was Joseph Smith, founder of the Latter Day Saint Movement. Atchison represented Smith in land disputes with non-Mormon settlers in Caldwell County and Daviess County.

Alexander William Doniphan joined Atchison's law practice in Liberty in May 1833.  The two became fast friends and spent many leisure time hours playing cards, going to horse races, hunting, fishing, and attending social functions and political events. Atchison, already a member of the Liberty Blues, a volunteer militia in Missouri, got Doniphan to join.

Atchison was elected to the Missouri House of Representatives in 1834. He worked hard for the Platte Purchase, which required Native American tribes to cede land to the United States and extended the northwestern boundary of Missouri to the Missouri River in 1837.

When early disputes broke out into the Mormon War of 1838, Atchison was appointed a major general in the state militia. He took part in suppressing violence by both sides.

Active in the Democratic Party, in 1838 Atchison was re-elected to the Missouri State House of Representatives.  In 1841, he was appointed a circuit court judge for the six-county area of the Platte Purchase. In 1843 he was named a county commissioner in Platte County, where he then lived.

Senate career
In October 1843, Atchison was appointed to the U.S. Senate to fill the vacancy left by the death of Lewis F. Linn.  He was the first senator from western Missouri to serve in this position. At age 36, he was the youngest senator from Missouri up to that time. Atchison was re-elected to a full term on his own account in 1849.

Atchison was very popular with his fellow Senate Democrats. When the Democrats took control of the US Senate in December 1845, they chose Atchison as President pro tempore, placing him second in succession for the Presidency. He also was responsible for presiding over the Senate when the Vice President was absent. At 38, he was a young man with low seniority in the Senate after two years to gain such a position.

In 1849 Atchison stepped down as President pro tempore in favor of William R. King.  King in turn yielded the office back to Atchison in December 1852, after being elected Vice President of the United States. Atchison continued as President pro tempore until December 1854.

As a Senator, Atchison was a fervent advocate of slavery and territorial expansion. He supported the annexation of Texas and the U.S.-Mexican War. Atchison and Thomas Hart Benton, Missouri's other Senator, became rivals and finally enemies, although both were Democrats. Benton declared himself to be against slavery in 1849. In 1851 Atchison allied with the Whigs to defeat incumbent Benton for re-election.

Benton, intending to challenge Atchison in 1854, began to agitate for territorial organization of the area west of Missouri (now the states of Kansas and Nebraska) so that it could be opened to settlement. To counter this, Atchison proposed that the area be organized and that the section of the Missouri Compromise banning slavery there be repealed in favor of popular sovereignty. Under this plan, settlers in each territory would vote to decide whether they would allow slavery.

At Atchison's request, Senator Stephen Douglas of Illinois introduced the Kansas–Nebraska Act, which embodied this idea, in November 1853. The Act was passed and became law in May 1854, establishing the Territories of Kansas and Nebraska.

Border Ruffians
Both Douglas and Atchison had believed that Nebraska would be settled by Free-State men from Iowa and Illinois, and Kansas by pro-slavery Missourians and other Southerners, thus preserving the numerical balance between free states and slave states in the nation. In 1854 Atchison helped found the town of Atchison, Kansas, as a pro-slavery settlement. The town (and county) were named for him.

While Southerners supported the idea of settling Kansas, few migrated there. Most free-soilers preferred Kansas to Nebraska. Furthermore, anti-slavery activists throughout the North came to view Kansas as a battleground and formed societies to encourage free-soil settlers to go to Kansas, to ensure there would be enough voters in both Kansas and Nebraska to approve their entry as free states.

It appeared as if the Kansas Territorial legislature to be elected in March 1855 would be controlled by free-soilers and ban slavery. This was viewed as a breach of faith by Atchison and his supporters. An angry Atchison called on pro-slavery Missourians to uphold slavery by force and "to kill every God-damned abolitionist in the district" if necessary. He recruited an immense mob of heavily armed Missourians, the infamous "Border Ruffians". On the election day, March 30, 1855, Atchison led 5,000 Border Ruffians into Kansas. They seized control of all polling places at gunpoint, cast tens of thousands of fraudulent votes for pro-slavery candidates, and elected a pro-slavery legislature.

The outrage was nonetheless accepted by the Federal government. When Territorial Governor Andrew Reeder objected, he was fired by President Franklin Pierce.

Despite this show of force, far more free-soilers than pro-slavery settlers migrated to Kansas. There were continual raids and ambushes by both sides in "Bleeding Kansas". In spite of the best efforts of Atchison and the Ruffians, Kansas rejected slavery and finally became a free state in 1861.

Charles Sumner, in the epic "Crimes Against Kansas" speech on May 19, 1856, exposed Atchison's role in the invasion, tortures, and killings in Kansas.  Speaking in the flamboyant style he and others used, lacing his prose with references to Roman history, Sumner compared Atchison to Roman Senator Catiline, who betrayed his country in a plot to overthrow the existing order.  For two days, Sumner listed crime, after crime, in detail, complete with documentation by newspapers and letters of the time, showing the tortures and violence by Atchison and his men.

Two days later, Atchison gave his own speech, totally unaware as yet that he was exposed on Senate floor in such a fashion. Atchison's speech was to the Texas men he just met, hired and paid for, Atchison reveals in his speech, by "authorities in Washington".   They are about to invade Lawrence Kansas.  Atchison makes the men promise to kill and "draw blood," and boasts of his flag, which was red in color for "Southern Rights" and the color of blood. They would press "to blood"  the spread of slavery into Kansas.   He revealed in this speech that the immediate goal of the invasion was to stop the newspaper in Lawrence from publishing anti-slavery material.  Atchison's men had made it a crime to publish anti-slavery newspapers in Kansas.

Atchison made it clear the men are to kill and draw blood, told the men they will be "well paid," and encouraged them to plunder from the homes that they invaded. That was after the hundreds of dozens of tortures and killings that Sumner had detailed in his Crimes Against Kansas speech. In other words, things were about to get much worse since Atchison had his hired men from Texas.

Defeated for re-election
Atchison's Senate term expired on March 3, 1855. He sought election to another term, but the Democrats in the Missouri legislature were split between him and Benton, while the Whig minority put forward their own man. No Senator was elected until January 1857, when James S. Green was chosen.

Railroad proposal
When the first transcontinental railroad was proposed in the 1850s, Atchison called for it to be built along the central route (from St. Louis through Missouri, Kansas, and Utah), rather than the southern route (from New Orleans through Texas and New Mexico). Naturally, his suggested route went through Atchison.

American Civil War
Atchison and his law partner Doniphan fell out over politics in 1859–1861, disagreeing on how Missouri should proceed.  Atchison favored secession, while Doniphan was torn and would remain for the most part non-committal. Privately Doniphan favored the Union, but found it difficult to oppose his friends and associates.

During the secession crisis in Missouri at the beginning of the American Civil War, Atchison sided with Missouri's pro-Confederate governor, Claiborne Jackson.  He was appointed a major general in the Missouri State Guard.  Atchison actively recruited State Guardsmen in northern Missouri and served with Guard commander General Sterling Price in the summer campaign of 1861.  In September 1861, Atchison led 3,500 State Guard recruits across the Missouri River to reinforce Price, and defeated Union troops that tried to block his force in the Battle of Liberty.

Atchison served in the State Guard through the end of 1861.  In March 1862, Union forces in the Trans-Mississippi theater won a decisive victory at Pea Ridge in Arkansas and secured Union control of Missouri. Atchison then resigned from the army over reported strategy arguments with Price and moved to Texas for the duration of the war.  After the war he retired to his farm near Gower. He denied many of his pro-slavery public statements made prior to the Civil War. Then, his retirement cottage outside of Plattsburg, Missouri burned to the ground before his death in 1886.  This entailed the complete loss of his library containing books, documents, and letters which documented his role in the Mormon War, Indian affairs, pro-slavery activities, Civil War activities, and other legislation covering his career as a lawyer, senator, and soldier.

Purported one-day presidency
Inauguration Day—March 4—fell on a Sunday in 1849, and so president-elect Zachary Taylor did not take the presidential oath of office until the next day. Even so, the term of the outgoing president, James K. Polk, ended at noon on March 4. On March 2, outgoing vice president George M. Dallas relinquished his position as president of the Senate. Congress had previously chosen Atchison as president pro tempore. In 1849, according to the Presidential Succession Act of 1792, the Senate president pro tempore immediately followed the vice president in the presidential line of succession. As Dallas's term also ended at noon on the 4th, and as neither Taylor nor vice president-elect Millard Fillmore had been sworn in to office on that day, it was claimed by some of Atchison's friends and colleagues that on March 4–5, 1849, Atchison was acting president of the United States.

Historians, constitutional scholars and biographers all dismiss the claim. They point out that Atchison's Senate term had also ended on March 4. When the Senate of the new Congress convened on March 5 to allow new senators and the new vice president to take the oath of office, the secretary of the Senate called members to order, as the Senate had no president pro tempore. Although an incoming president must take the oath of office before any official acts, the prevailing view is that presidential succession does not depend on the oath. Even supposing that an oath were necessary, Atchison never took it, so he was no more the president than Taylor.

In September 1872, Atchison, who never himself claimed that he was technically president, told a reporter for the Plattsburg Lever:

Death

Atchison died on January 26, 1886, at his home near Gower, Missouri at the age of 78. He was buried at Greenlawn Cemetery in Plattsburg, Missouri. His grave marker reads "President of the United States for One Day."

Legacy
Atchison, Kansas county seat of Atchison County, Kansas
Atchison County, Missouri
USS Atchison County (LST-60) ship
In 1991, Atchison was inducted into the Hall of Famous Missourians, and a bronze bust depicting him is on permanent display in the rotunda of the Missouri State Capitol.
Atchison County Historical Museum in Atchison, Kansas includes a museum exhibit, jokingly titled the "World's Smallest Presidential Library" devoted to Atchison.
A historical marker designating the approximate site of Atchison's birth is located along Highway 1974 in the Landsdowne neighborhood of Lexington, Kentucky.

See also
List of American Civil War generals (Confederate)
List of United States senators from Missouri

References

External links

David Rice Atchinson: On Being President For A Day - Original Letters Shapell Manuscript Foundation
Urban Legends: President for a Day
Another view of the President for a Day claim
Useless Information: David Rice Atchison
U.S. Senate Historical Minute Essay

 
 

 
 

1807 births
1886 deaths
County commissioners in Missouri
Politicians from Lexington, Kentucky
Missouri state court judges
Missouri Democrats
Members of the Missouri House of Representatives
Presidents pro tempore of the United States Senate
Bleeding Kansas
Transylvania University alumni
Missouri State Guard
Democratic Party United States senators from Missouri
Confederate militia generals
American proslavery activists
American slave owners
Activists from Missouri
19th-century American politicians
19th-century American judges
United States senators who owned slaves